Silures de Bobo-Dioulasso  was a Burkinabé football club based in Bobo-Dioulasso. In the seventies it was the leading team of the Upper Volta. It went out of existence in 1982.

Achievements
Champions Upper-Volta: 7
 1974, 1975, 1976, 1977, 1978, 1979, 1980

Coupe du Haute-Volte: 1
 1981

Performance in CAF competitions
 African Cup of Champions Clubs: 6 appearances
1975: Second Round
1976: Second Round
1978: Quarter-Finals
1979: Second Round
1980: Second Round
1981: Second Round

External links
Club profile – footballdatabase

Football clubs in Burkina Faso
Association football clubs disestablished in 1982
1982 disestablishments in Upper Volta